Gonzalo Arantegui Peñafiel (born 12 June 1977), commonly known as Lalo, is a Spanish retired footballer who played as a right winger, and a director of football.

Playing career
Born in Zaragoza, Aragon, Lalo made his senior debut at the age of just 17 with UD Casetas, in Segunda División B. In 1996 he moved to Real Zaragoza, being assigned to the reserves also in the third division.

Lalo subsequently resumed his career mostly in the division three, representing Levante UD, Águilas CF (two stints), CF Gandía, Jerez CF, Sevilla Atlético, CD Binéfar (where he scored a career-best 13 goals in 2002–03), UB Conquense, Cultural y Deportiva Leonesa, SD Huesca and Unión Estepona CF. His professional inputs consisted of six Segunda División appearances with Huesca in the 2008–09 campaign, with his debut occurring on 31 August 2008 in a 2–2 home draw against CD Castellón.

In 2011, after one season at Tercera División side SD Ejea, Lalo retired at the age of 34.

Post-playing career
Immediately after retiring, Lalo started working as a director of football in his last club Ejea. He left the club in the following year to join another club he represented as a player, Zaragoza, as a scout.

In August 2015, after one year as a scout at Villarreal CF, Lalo joined Huesca, another former side, as a director of football. On 28 February 2017, he returned to Zaragoza under the same role.

References

External links

1977 births
Living people
Footballers from Zaragoza
Spanish footballers
Association football wingers
Segunda División players
Segunda División B players
Tercera División players
Real Zaragoza B players
Levante UD footballers
Águilas CF players
Jerez CF players
Sevilla Atlético players
CD Binéfar players
UB Conquense footballers
Cultural Leonesa footballers
SD Huesca footballers
SD Ejea players
CF Gandía players